Kevin Joseph Huerter (born August 27, 1998) is an American professional basketball player for the Sacramento Kings of the National Basketball Association (NBA). Nicknamed "Red Velvet", he played college basketball for the Maryland Terrapins.

High school career
Huerter, a  shooting guard, played at Shenendehowa High School in Clifton Park, New York, a suburban town located in Saratoga County. During his career, he led the school to its second state championship and, as a senior, was named Mr. New York Basketball.

Recruiting
On September 7, 2015, Huerter committed to play college basketball for Maryland, choosing the Terrapins over 20 offers. By the end of his high school career, Huerter was considered a four-star recruit and was ranked No.50 overall recruit and No.11 shooting guard in the 2016 high school class.

College career

Huerter earned a starting position as a freshman, averaging 9.3 points and 4.9 rebounds per game on the season. Following his freshman season, he was selected to the United States team for the 2017 FIBA Under-19 Basketball World Cup, where the team finished third.

As a sophomore, Huerter increased his production, scoring 14.8 points and averaging 5 rebounds per game. At the close of the season, he was named honorable mention All-Big Ten.

Professional career

Atlanta Hawks (2018–2022) 
Following his sophomore season at Maryland, Huerter declared his eligibility for the 2018 NBA draft without an agent. He was selected to participate in the NBA Draft Combine. After working out with the Los Angeles Lakers, Huerter opted to hire an agent and remain in the NBA draft, forgoing his final two years of college eligibility on May 30, 2018.

On June 21, 2018, Huerter was selected with the nineteenth overall pick by the Atlanta Hawks in the 2018 NBA draft. On July 1, 2018, Huerter officially signed with the Hawks.

On December 31, 2018, Huerter's first 20-point game came against the Indiana Pacers, during which he scored 22 points in a 116–108 loss. On January 11, 2019, Huerter scored a season-high 29 points against the Philadelphia 76ers in a 123–121 victory. At the end of the 2018–19 NBA season, Huerter was voted to the All-Rookie Second Team.

In Game 7 of the Eastern Conference Semi-Finals against the Philadelphia 76ers, Huerter scored a playoff career-high 27 points, to lead the Hawks to their first Eastern Conference Finals appearance since 2015.

On October 18, 2021, Huerter signed a four-year, $65 million rookie contract extension with the Hawks.

Sacramento Kings (2022–present)
On July 6, 2022, Huerter was traded to the Sacramento Kings in exchange for Maurice Harkless, Justin Holiday, and a future first-round pick. On October 19, Huerter made his Kings debut, recording 23 points, three rebounds and two assists in a 115–108 loss to the Portland Trail Blazers.

Career statistics

NBA

Regular season

|-
| style="text-align:left;"| 
| style="text-align:left;"| Atlanta
| 75 || 59 || 27.3 || .419 || .385 || .732 || 3.3 || 2.9 || .9 || .3 || 9.7
|-
| style="text-align:left;"| 
| style="text-align:left;"| Atlanta
| 56 || 48 || 31.4 || .413 || .380 || .828 || 4.1 || 3.8 || .9 || .5 || 12.2
|-
| style="text-align:left;"| 
| style="text-align:left;"| Atlanta
| 69 || 49 || 30.8 || .432 || .363 || .781 || 3.3 || 3.5 || 1.2 || .3 || 11.9
|-
| style="text-align:left;"| 
| style="text-align:left;"| Atlanta
| 74 || 60 || 29.6 || .454 || .389 || .808 || 3.4 || 2.7 || .7 || .4 || 12.1
|- class="sortbottom"
| style="text-align:center;" colspan="2"| Career
| 274 || 216 || 29.6 || .431 || .379 || .788 || 3.5 || 3.2 || .9 || .4 || 11.4

Playoffs

|-
| style="text-align:left;"| 2021
| style="text-align:left;"| Atlanta
| 18 || 10 || 31.0 || .428 || .347 || .706 || 3.8 || 2.8 || .8 || .9 || 11.1
|-
| style="text-align:left;"| 2022
| style="text-align:left;"| Atlanta
| 5 || 5 || 30.7 || .362 || .290 || .750 || 3.0 || 3.8 || 1.2 || .6 || 9.2
|- class="sortbottom"
| style="text-align:center;" colspan="2"| Career
| 23 || 15 || 30.9 || .414 || .333 || .714 || 3.7 || 3.0 || .9 || .8 || 10.7

College

|-
| style="text-align:left;"| 2016–17
| style="text-align:left;"| Maryland
| 33 || 33 || 29.4 || .420 || .371 || .714 || 4.9 || 2.7 || 1.0 || .7 || 9.3
|-
| style="text-align:left;"| 2017–18
| style="text-align:left;"| Maryland
| 32 || 32 || 34.4 || .503 || .417 || .758 || 5.0 || 3.4 || .6 || .7 || 14.8
|- class="sortbottom"
| style="text-align:center;" colspan="2"| Career
| 65 || 65 || 31.9 || .466 || .394 || .749 || 5.0 || 3.0 || .8 || .7 || 12.0

Personal life
Huerter was raised in Clifton Park, New York, by his parents Tom and Erin Huerter. He has a brother and two sisters. His father played college basketball for Siena College, and his brother has also played for them.

Huerter also played baseball as a child and is a fan of the New York Yankees. His Babe Ruth League team was coached by his father, and finished third at the 2013 14U World Series. Huerter was a teammate of Ian Anderson within the Babe Ruth League and high school baseball.

References

External links

Maryland Terrapins bio
USA Basketball bio

1998 births
Living people
American men's basketball players
Atlanta Hawks draft picks
Atlanta Hawks players
Basketball players from New York (state)
Maryland Terrapins men's basketball players
People from Clifton Park, New York
Sacramento Kings players
Shooting guards
Small forwards
Sportspeople from Albany, New York